Dell'Acqua is an Italian surname. Notable people with the surname include:

Gaspare dell'Acqua (active circa 1460), Italian painter of the Renaissance period, active mainly in Genoa and Pavia

Alberto Dell'Acqua (born 1938), Italian stuntman and actor
Alessandro Dell'Acqua (born 1962), Italian fashion designer
Angelo Dell'Acqua (1903–1972), Italian Roman Catholic cardinal
Arturo Dell'Acqua Bellavitis (born 1947), the current director of the Milan Triennale Foundation and Exposition
Casey Dellacqua (born 1985), Australian tennis player
Cesare Dell'Acqua (1821–1905), Italian painter
Eva Dell'Acqua (1856–1930), Belgian singer and composer
Massimo Dell'Acqua (born 1979), Italian professional tennis player 
Simone Dell'Acqua (born 1989), Italian footballer

Italian-language surnames